The 1947 College Football All-America team is composed of college football players who were selected as All-Americans by various organizations and writers that chose College Football All-America Teams in 1947. The eight selectors recognized by the NCAA as "official" for the 1947 season are (1), the American Football Coaches Association (AFCA), (2) the Associated Press (AP), (3) Collier's Weekly, as selected by Grantland Rice, (4) the Football Writers Association of America (FW), (5) the International News Service (INS), (6) the Newspaper Enterprise Association (NEA), (7) the Sporting News (SN), and (8) the United Press (UP).  Other selectors include the Central Press Association (CP) and the Walter Camp Football Foundation (WC).

Notre Dame quarterback Johnny Lujack and Michigan halfback Bob Chappuis were the only two players unanimously named by all eight official selectors as first-team All-Americans.  Lujack and Chappuis also finished first and second in the 1947 Heisman Trophy voting.

Consensus All-Americans
For the year 1947, the NCAA recognizes eight published All-American teams as "official" designations for purposes of its consensus determinations. The following chart identifies the NCAA-recognized consensus All-Americans and displays which first-team designations they received. The chart also reflects the published point total from the UP poll (2,211 points possible).

All-American selections for 1947

Ends
Paul Cleary, USC (College Football Hall of Fame) 
Bill Swiacki, Columbia 
Barney Poole, Mississippi (College Football Hall of Fame) 
Leon Hart, Notre Dame (College Football Hall of Fame) 
Bob Mann, Michigan 
Ike Owens, Illinois 
Len Ford, Michigan (Pro Football Hall of Fame) 
Tom Fears, UCLA (College and Pro Football Hall of Fame) 
Barney Hafen, Utah 
Max Bumgardner, Texas

Tackles
Bob Davis, Georgia Tech 
George Connor, Notre Dame (College and Pro Football Hall of Fame) 
John Ferraro, USC (College Football Hall of Fame) 
Richard Harris, Texas 
Zygmont Czarobski, Notre Dame (College Football Hall of Fame) 
Malachi Mills, VMI 
George Savitsky, Penn 
Bruce Hilkene, Michigan 
Goble Bryant, Army 
Phil O'Reilly, Purdue 
Alex Agase, Illinois (College Football Hall of Fame)

Guards
William Fischer, Notre Dame (College Football Hall of Fame) 
Joe Steffy, Army (College Football Hall of Fame) 
Steve Suhey, Penn State (College Football Hall of Fame) 
Leo Nomellini, Minnesota (College and Pro Football Hall of Fame) 
Rod Franz, California (College Football Hall of Fame) 
Knox Ramsey, William & Mary 
Mike Dimitro, UCLA 
J.W. Magee, Rice 
Jon Baker, California 
Howard Brown, Indiana 
Dominic Tomasi, Michigan 
Herbert Siegert, Illinois 
Bill Healy, Georgia Tech

Centers
Chuck Bednarik, Pennsylvania (College and Pro Football Hall of Fame) 
Dick Scott, Navy 
Jay Rhodemyre, Kentucky 
George Strohmeyer, Notre Dame 
John Rapacz, Oklahoma 
J. T. White, Michigan

Quarterbacks
Johnny Lujack, Notre Dame (College Football Hall of Fame) 
Bobby Layne, Texas (College and Pro Football Hall of Fame) 
Charlie Conerly, Mississippi (College Football Hall of Fame)

Backs
Bob Chappuis, Michigan (College Football Hall of Fame) 
Doak Walker, SMU (College and Pro Football Hall of Fame) 
Ray Evans, Kansas (College Football Hall of Fame) 
Bump Elliott, Michigan (College Football Hall of Fame) 
Skip Minisi, Penn (College Football Hall of Fame) 
Harry Gilmer, Alabama (College Football Hall of Fame) 
Charlie Justice, North Carolina (College Football Hall of Fame) 
Clyde Scott, Arkansas (College Football Hall of Fame) 
Jack Cloud, William & Mary (College Football Hall of Fame) 
George Taliaferro, Indiana (College Football Hall of Fame) 
Don Doll, USC 
Elwyn Rowan, Army 
Jake Leicht, Oregon 
Terry Brennan, Notre Dame 
Harry Szulborski, Purdue

Key
 Bold – Consensus All-American
 -1 – First-team selection
 -2 – Second-team selection
 -3 – Third-team selection

Official selections
 AFCA = American Football Coaches Association, published in the Saturday Evening Post
 AP = Associated Press
 CO = Collier's Weekly, selected by Grantland Rice
 FWAA = Football Writers Association of America
 INS = International News Service (Hearst newspaper syndicate)
 NEA = Newspaper Enterprise Association, based on a consensus of coaches, scouts, officials, opposing players, and "others qualified to judge players and accurately weigh their value."
 SN = Sporting News
 UP = United Press

Other selectors
 CP = Central Press Association, selected with the assistance of the nation's football captains.
 WC = Walter Camp Football Foundation

See also
 1947 All-Big Six Conference football team
 1947 All-Big Ten Conference football team
 1947 All-Pacific Coast Conference football team
 1947 All-SEC football team
 1947 All-Southwest Conference football team

References

All-America Team
College Football All-America Teams